Benjamin Samuel Bloom (February 21, 1913 – September 13, 1999) was an American educational psychologist who made contributions to the classification of educational objectives and to the theory of mastery learning. He is particularly noted for leading educational psychologists to develop the comprehensive system of describing and assessing educational outcomes in the mid-1950s. He has influenced the practices and philosophies of educators around the world from the latter part of the twentieth century.

Early life and education 
Bloom was born in Lansford, Pennsylvania, to an immigrant Jewish family. His parents fled a climate of discrimination in Russia.  Bloom was one of five children, three being older brothers and one a younger sister. His father was a picture framer and his mother was a homemaker. Bloom achieved excellence most notably in his academics while also showing athletic ability in swimming and handball. He graduated high school as his class valedictorian.

After graduating from Pennsylvania State College, he worked as a research worker with the Pennsylvania State Relief Organization. The following year, he moved to Washington to do similar work with the American Youth Council. His work with the AYC led to his meeting and work with Ralph Tyler, where he would help design assessments for Ralph Tyler’s Eight-Year Study. Bloom then applied for the doctorate program under the University of Chicago in 1939, as this would give Bloom the chance to study under Ralph Tyler. Bloom would marry his wife Sophie the following year in 1940, as she was pursuing her masters in the University of Chicago. Bloom achieved his doctorate in 1942.

Bloom worked for the University of Chicago’s Board of Examinations from 1940-1959. The purpose of the Board of Examinations was to improve on the quality of education given by the University of Chicago through modifying the university’s educational requirements and assessments. Bloom’s work during his time with the Board of Examinations reflected this goal as his works were based on how to teach and educational measurement. Bloom later succeeded Ralph Tyler as the University Examiner in 1953. By 1960, Bloom had left his position in the Board of Examinations and worked at Stanford, California for the Center for Advanced Study in Behavioral Sciences.

From the late 1950s to the late 1980s, Bloom had begun doing work on education internationally. In Hamburg, Germany Bloom attended a UNESCO Institution of Education meeting. Following the meeting, the International Association for the Evaluation of Educational Achievement (IEA) was founded in an attempt to encourage cross-national studies on educational achievement. Bloom was a cofounder for this organization. Through this organization Bloom would conduct studies alongside colleagues with the purpose of collecting data to improve and observe on education on a global level. By 1986, Bloom was invited to the University of Shanghai as 1 of 25 exchange scholars between China and the United States.

Works 
In 1956, Bloom edited the first volume of The Taxonomy of Educational Objectives: The Classification of Educational Goals, which classified learning objectives according to a rubric that has come to be known as Bloom's Taxonomy. It was one of the first attempts to systematically classify levels of cognitive functioning and gave structure to the otherwise amorphous mental processes of gifted students. Bloom's Taxonomy remains a foundation of the academic profession according to the 1981 survey, "Significant Writings That Have Influenced the Curriculum: 1906–81" by Harold G. Shane and the National Society for the Study of Education. Bloom's 2 Sigma Problem is also attributed to him.

Benjamin Bloom conducted research on student achievement. Through conducting a variety of studies, Bloom and his colleagues observed factors within the school environment as well as outside of it that can affect how children can learn. One example was the lack of variation in teaching. Bloom hypothesized if teachers adapted their teaching methods to the individual needs of each student, more children would receive the opportunity to learn better. This led to the creation of Bloom’s Mastery Learning procedure. This procedure required that teachers organize skills and concepts into instructional units approximately 1–2 weeks in length. At the end of the unit, the student would receive an assessment that would provide the student with constructive feedback on what the child learned from the unit. If a child lacked understanding on any of the major concepts of the unit, they would be assigned corrective assignments based on information they had trouble understanding. They would then take a second assessment focusing specifically on the skills and concepts they were instructed to practice on. This insures each student gains individualized instruction at a pace the child needs in order to learn at an optimum level. For students who showed mastery of the given unit, it is recommended they receive enrichment activities to further learning experiences. These activities are self-selected by the student and may come in the form of academic games, reports, special projects, etc.

Aside from his work on educational objectives and outcomes, Bloom also directed a research team that evaluated and elucidated the process of developing exceptional talents in individuals, shedding light upon the phenomena of vocational eminence and the concept of greatness.

In the article The Role of Gifts and Markers in the Development of Talent, 70 individuals that are known as being among the best in their field are interviewed, in addition to their parents, teachers, and other significant persons in their life. The purpose of the interviews was to collect the various special characteristics believed to have been the reasons for their success. The individuals studied were mathematicians, Olympic swimmers, and concert pianists who were arguably some of the most successful in their field. The three main characteristics frequently shared in the interviews by the individuals, their parents, and teachers was willingness to work, competitiveness, and ability to learn new techniques. By the end of the Bloom’s interviews, it was noted after all the data was collected that the interpretation of the parent’s children as being talented led to the parents creating an environment that allowed for growth within the subject through hiring teachers/tutors, opportunities in the form of competitions and events, and overall encouragement from the parents and others involved in the individuals life. The belief that the individuals were talented, the attention given to a specific characteristic observed, as well as the possible inherent gift of the individual were considered to be markers. The markers were defined as the major reasons for the encouragement and motivation exhibited by the teachers and parents of the successful individuals. These factors in addition to the individual’s interest and willingness to work in their respective field are arguably some of the reasons for their huge success.

References 

5. Anderson, L. W. (2003). Benjamin S Bloom: His life, his works, and his legacy. In B. J. Zimmerman & D. H. Schunk (Eds.), Educational psychology: A century of contributions. (pp. 367–389). Lawrence Erlbaum Associates Publishers.

6. Bloom, B. S. (1982). The role of gifts and markers in the development of talent. Except. Child, 48, 510–522.

7. Guskey, T. R. (2007). Closing achievement gaps: revisiting Benjamin S Bloom’s “learning for mastery.” Journal of Advanced Academics, 19(1), 8–31..

Further reading
 Bloom, Benjamin Sapkota (1980). All Our Children Learning. New York: McGraw-Hill.
 Bloom, Benjamin S. Taxonomy of Educational Objectives (1956). Published by Allyn and Bacon, Boston, MA. Copyright (c) 1984 by Pearson Education.
 Bloom, B. S. (ed). (1985). Developing Talent in Young People. New York: Ballantine Books.
 Eisner, Eliot W. "Benjamin Bloom: 1913-1999." Prospects, the quarterly review of comparative education (Paris, UNESCO: International Bureau of Education), vol. XXX, no. 3, September 2000. Retrieved from http://www.ibe.unesco.org/publications/ThinkersPdf/bloome.pdf on April 10, 2009.
 Torsten Husén, Benjamin S. Bloom, in: Joy A. Palmer (ed), Fifty Modern Thinkers on Education: From Piaget to the Present Day, London - New York: Routledge, 2001, pp. 86–90.

External links
 Benjamin Bloom - Mastery Learning

1913 births
1999 deaths
20th-century educational theorists
American educational theorists
20th-century American psychologists
American cognitive psychologists
American educational psychologists
Pennsylvania State University alumni
People from Carbon County, Pennsylvania
University of Chicago alumni
University of Chicago faculty